Ilkka is a masculine Finnish given name. Notable people with the name include:

Ilkka Alanko (born 1969), Finnish musician
Ilkka Hakalehto (1936–2009), Finnish historian and politician
Ilkka Hanski (1953–2016), scientist and ecologist at Helsinki University, Finland
Ilkka Heikkinen (born 1984), Finnish professional ice hockey defenceman
Ilkka Heilä (born 1956), Finnish cartoonist who lives in Kaarina
Ilkka Herola (born 1995), Finnish Nordic combined skier
Ilkka Jääskeläinen (born 1979), singer who won Idols Finland 2 (Finnish Pop Idol)
Ilkka Kanerva (born 1948), member of the Finnish Parliament
Ilkka Koski (1928–1993), former Finnish boxer
Ilkka Kuusisto (born 1933), Finnish composer of popular opera; father of Jaakko Kuusisto
Ilkka Laitinen (1962–2019), Finnish politician
Ilkka Lipsanen (born 1942), also known as Danny, Finnish singer and guitarist
Ilkka Mäkelä (born 1963), Finnish football manager and former player
Ilkka Mesikämmen (born 1943), retired professional ice hockey player
Ilkka Mikkola (born 1979), professional ice hockey player
Ilkka Niiniluoto (born 1946), Finnish philosopher, mathematician, professor of philosophy at the University of Helsinki
Ilkka Nummisto (1944–2019), Finnish sprint canoeist
Ilkka Pikkarainen (born 1981), Finnish ice hockey right winger
Ilkka Remes (born 1962), Finnish author of thrillers and young adult literature
Ilkka Sinisalo (1958–2017), former professional ice hockey player
Ilkka Suominen (born 1939), Finnish politician from the National Coalition Party
Ilkka Talvi (born 1948), Finnish violinist
Ilkka Taipale (born 1942), Finnish doctor and politician
Ilkka Tuomi (born 1958), native of Finland, is noted for writings on the subject of the Internet
Ilkka Vaarasuo (born 1983), former ice hockey defenceman
Ilkka Vartiovaara (1946–2010), Finnish medical doctor, author, editor, artist and columnist
Ilkka Villi (born 1975), Finnish actor

See also
Jaakko Ilkka (1545–1597), Finnish yeoman and trader
Jaakko Ilkka (opera), opera by Finnish composer Jorma Panula

Finnish masculine given names